David Howell (January 1, 1747 – July 30, 1824) was a Delegate to the Congress of the Confederation from Rhode Island, an associate justice of the Supreme Court of Rhode Island, Attorney General of Rhode Island and a United States district judge of the United States District Court for the District of Rhode Island.

Education and career

Born on January 1, 1747, in Morristown, Morris County, Province of New Jersey, British America, Howell attended Eaton's Academy in Hopewell, Province of New Jersey, then graduated from the College of New Jersey (now Princeton University) in 1766 and received an Artium Magister degree in 1769 from Rhode Island College (now Brown University). He was a Professor of Natural Philosophy at Brown University from 1766 to 1824, also serving as a fellow from 1773 to 1824, as Secretary from 1780 to 1806, and as Acting President from 1791 to 1792. He was in private practice in Providence, Colony of Rhode Island and Providence Plantations, British America (State of Rhode Island, United States from July 4, 1776) from 1768 to 1779, and from 1781 to 1782. He was a Justice of the Peace for Providence in 1779. He was a justice of the Rhode Island Court of Common Pleas for Providence County in 1780. He was a Delegate to the Congress of the Confederation (Continental Congress) from 1782 to 1785. He was an associate justice of the Supreme Court of Rhode Island from May 1786 to May 1787. He was Attorney General of Rhode Island in 1789. He was a boundary commissioner for the United States in New York City, New York in 1794.

Notable legal apprentice

Among the prospective attorneys who studied law with Howell was Asa Aldis, who later served as chief justice of the Vermont Supreme Court.

Federal judicial service

Howell was nominated by President James Madison on November 12, 1812, to a seat on the United States District Court for the District of Rhode Island vacated by Judge David L. Barnes. He was confirmed by the United States Senate on November 16, 1812, and received his commission on November 17, 1812. His service terminated on July 30, 1824, due to his death in Providence. He was interred in North Burial Ground in Providence.

Family

Howell was the father of Jeremiah B. Howell, a United States senator from Rhode Island.

References

Sources

External links

 

1747 births
1824 deaths
Continental Congressmen from Rhode Island
18th-century American politicians
Judges of the United States District Court for the District of Rhode Island
United States federal judges appointed by James Madison
19th-century American judges
Justices of the Rhode Island Supreme Court
Presidents of Brown University
Brown University faculty
People of colonial Rhode Island
People of colonial New Jersey
Princeton University alumni
Rhode Island Attorneys General
People from Morristown, New Jersey
Burials at North Burying Ground (Providence)
Brown University alumni